Marang Rami Molosiwa (born 1991) is a Botswana actor who was the host to the TV programme "Mantlwaneng". She appeared in MTV Shuga in 2020 as the only actor from Botswana.

Life
Molosiwa comes from the "Serowe Palapye" area but she was raised in Gaborone. She was acting by 2002 but she went on to train much later when she graduated in drama at the University of Pretoria in 2013 although another source says the University of Witwatersrand.

She had come to be noticed as the host of the children's TV programme "Mantlwaneng". Mantlwaneng was a leading programme on a fledgling Botswana TV and Molosiwa was one of its child stars. She, Rea Kopi, Phenyo Mogampane and StaXx have gone onto careers based on this early experience.

She has appeared on the stage. In August and September 2015 she led the cast at the Artscape Theatre Centre.

In 2020 she was chosen to join the multinational TV series MTV Shuga. It was an edutainment series that had been targeted at HIV awareness. She played Bokang a classmate of the character Dineo who according to the story goes to South Africa for her education and then returns to Botswana. She is able to join the story as they chat on-line during the coronavirus lockdown.

MTV Shuga had transformed into a mini-series titled MTV Shuga Alone Together highlighting the problems of Coronavirus on 20 April 2020. The show was written by Tunde Aladese and Nkiru Njoku and it was broadcast for 70 nights - its backers include the United Nations. The series was based in Nigeria, South Africa, Kenya and Côte d'Ivoire and the story was explained with on-line conversations between the characters. All of the filming, makeup, lighting etc. was done by the actors who include Lerato Walaza, Mohau Cele and Jemima Osunde She was the only actor from Botswana.

Personal life
Molosiwa announced that she and the retired footballer Dipsy Selolwane were having a child in May 2020. This was Selolwane's second child. They had been partners for four years.The pair got married in 2021.

See also 

 Dipsy Selolwane
 Sasa Klaas
 Charma Gal

References

1992 births
Living people
21st-century Botswana actresses
Date of birth missing (living people)
People from Gaborone
Botswana actresses